Sean Roberts is a Republican member of the Oklahoma House of Representatives, currently serving the 36th District of Oklahoma. He first assumed office in 2011 and is term limited from running for reelection in 2022.

Oklahoma House of Representatives
On July 31, 2020, he drew national media attention for threatening the Oklahoma City Thunder basketball team by saying he would pull the team's tax breaks if its players kneeled for the United States National Anthem as part of the ongoing U.S. national anthem protests and George Floyd protests. All of the players and coaches from both the Thunder and the opposing Utah Jazz kneeled anyway.

In 2021, in the midst of a nationwide effort by Republicans to make voting laws more restrictive following claims of widespread election fraud in the 2020 presidential election, Roberts proposed a bill that would require all registered voters in Oklahoma to re-register before the next general election.

2022 Campaign for Labor Commissioner
In January 2022, Roberts announced he would campaign against incumbent Frank Lucas for Oklahoma's 3rd congressional district. However, former president Donald Trump endorsed Lucas for reelection in April before candidate filing deadlines. Roberts instead filed for Labor Commissioner and was endorsed by Governor Kevin Stitt in the Republican primary.

References 

1973 births
21st-century American politicians
Candidates in the 2022 United States elections
Living people
Republican Party members of the Oklahoma House of Representatives